Nationality words link to articles with information on the nation's poetry or literature (for instance, Irish or France).

Events
 March – Art student Vachel Lindsay goes into the streets of New York City and tries to sell or give away copies of one of his poems. The take: 13 cents. His reaction: Ecstasy. "Now let there be here recorded my conclusions from one evening, one hour of peddling poetry. I am so rejoiced over it and so uplifted I am going to do it many times. It sets the heart trembling with happiness. The people like poetry as well as the scholars, or better."
 December 15 – The Pushkin House is established in Saint Petersburg, Russia, to preserve the cultural heritage of Alexander Pushkin.
 Ezra Pound presents Hilda Doolittle (the poet "H.D.") with a sheaf of love poems with the collective title Hilda's Book.

Works published in English

Canada
 Wilfred Campbell, The Collected Poems of Wilfred Campbell
 James Capon, Roberts and the Influences of His Time, critical work on Charles G. D. Roberts
 Isabella Valancy Crawford, The Collected Poems of Isabella Valancy Crawford, John W. Garvin ed., posthumously published
 William Henry Drummond, The Voyageur and other Poems
 Arthur Wentworth Hamilton Eaton:
 Acadian Ballads, and De Soto's Last Dream
 Poems of the Christian Year
 Duncan Campbell Scott, New World Lyrics and Ballads, including "The Forsaken", Canada

United Kingdom
 Edmund Clerihew Bentley, Biography for Beginners with the first publication of the clerihew
 Robert Bridges, Demeter
 Joseph Campbell, The Garden of Bees
 W. H. Davies, The Soul's Destroyer, and Other Poems
 Ernest Dowson, The Poems of Ernest Dowson
 R. C. Dutt, editor, Indian Poetry: Selected and Rendered Into English, London: J.M. Dent and Co.,  163 pages; anthology; Indian poetry in English, published in the United Kingdom
 Violet Jacob, Verses, Scottish poet
 Sarojini Naidu, The Golden Threshold
 Algernon Charles Swinburne, The Poems of Algernon Charles Swinburne
 Arthur Symons, A Book of Twenty Songs
 Katharine Tynan, Innocencies
 Oscar Wilde, "De Profundis" (posthumous)

United States
 Madison Cawein, Vale of Tempe
 Paul Laurence Dunbar, Lyrics of Sunshine and Shadow
 Trumbull Stickney, Poems
 John Hall Wheelock, with Van Wyck Brooks, Verses by Two Undergraduates

Other in English
 R. C. Dutt, editor, Indian Poetry: Selected and Rendered Into English, London: J.M. Dent and Co.,  163 pages; anthology; Indian poetry in English, published in the United Kingdom
 Francis Jammes, Tristesses, France
 Sarojini Naidu, The Golden Threshold, Indian poet writing in English, published in Britain (text available online)
 Violet Teague - Night Fall in the Ti-Tree, Australian Artist's book containing poetry

Works published in other languages

Indian subcontinent
Including all of the British colonies that later became India, Pakistan, Bangladesh, Sri Lanka and Nepal. Listed alphabetically by first name, regardless of surname:

 Ardoshir Faramji Kharbardar, Vilasika  (Indian Parsi writing in Gujarati)
 Brij Raj, Vagdevi, Indian, Dogri-Pahadi Brij Bhasha
 Kavi Dalpatram Nanalal, ' 'Vasantotsav' ', Gujarati language, India

Other languages and such
 Paul Claudel, France
 Poèmes de la Sexagésime
 "Vers d'Exil", poems published in L'Ermitage magazine
 Gjergj Fishta, Lahuta e Malcís ("The Highland Lute"), begins publication, Albania
 Rainer Maria Rilke, The Book of Hours (Das Stunden-Buch), Germany
 Octavian Goga - Poezii

Births
Death years link to the corresponding "[year] in poetry" article:
 January 3 – Padraic Fallon (died 1974), Irish
 January 6 – Idris Davies (died 1956), Welsh poet writing first in that language, later in English
 January 10 – R. A. K. Mason (died 1971), New Zealander
 March 2 – Geoffrey Grigson (died 1985), American
 March 9:
 Peter Quennell (died 1993), English
 Rex Warner (died 1986), Irish
 March 18 – Alfred Bailey (died 1997), Canadian poet, anthropologist, ethno-historian and academic administrator
 March 21 – Phyllis McGinley (died 1978), American
 April 10 – Norma Davis (died 1945), Australian
 April 17 – Carlos Oquendo de Amat (died 1936), Peruvian poet, author of 5 Meters of Poems (1927)
 April 22 – Robert Choquette  (died 1991) Canadian novelist, poet and diplomat
 April 24 – Robert Penn Warren (died 1989), American poet, critic, novelist and academic
 May 15 – Annadashankar Roy  (died 2002), Bengali poet
 June 8 – Brian Coffey (died 1995), Irish poet and publisher
 June 25 – Jun'ichi Yoda 与田凖 (died 1997), Japanese Shōwa period poet and children's book author
 July 29 – Stanley Kunitz (died 2006), American poet
 August 28 – Len Fox (died 2004), Australian writer, social activist and painter
 November 4 – Xavier Abril (died 1990), Peruvian poet and critic
 November 10 – Kurt Eggers (killed in action 1943), German writer, poet, songwriter and playwright 
 November 13 – Mary Elizabeth Frye (died 2004), American housewife, florist, author of the poem "Do not stand at my grave and weep"
 December 22 – Kenneth Rexroth (died 1982), American poet
 December 31 – Frank Marshall Davis (died 1987), American poet
 Also:
 Winifred Maitland Shaw, Australian 
 Ibrahim Touqan إبراهيم طوقان (died 1941), Palestinian, Arab-language

Deaths
 July 1 – John Hay, 66 (born 1838), American statesman, diplomat, author, poet, journalist and private secretary and assistant to Abraham Lincoln
 September 18 – George MacDonald, 80 (born 1824), Scottish-born author, poet and Christian minister known mostly for his fantasy stories
 October 13 – Violet Fane (Mary, Baroness Currie, née Mary Montgomerie Lamb), 62 (born 1843), English
 October 28 – Alphonse Allais, 51 (died 1905), French humorist
 December 29 – Victor Daley, 47 (born 1858), Irish-born Australian

Awards and honors

See also

 20th century in poetry
 20th century in literature
 List of years in poetry
 List of years in literature
 French literature of the 20th century
 Silver Age of Russian Poetry
 Young Poland (Młoda Polska) a modernist period in Polish  arts and literature, roughly from 1890 to 1918
 Poetry

Notes

Poetry

20th-century poetry